Timothy Carroll may refer to:

 Timothy Carroll (athlete) (1888–1955), Irish track and field athlete
 Timothy Carroll (bishop) (born 1940), Irish-born Roman Catholic bishop
 Timothy Carroll, lead vocalist and guitarist for Australian indie rock band Holy Holy

See also
 Tim Carroll (born 1951), Canadian politician and educator